Dr. Nissan Katzenelson (1862, Babruysk – 1925), was a Russian Jewish activist, member of the First State Duma of the Russian Empire in 1906-1907.

This Libau banker, son of Yosef Katzenelson and Feye Breyne Katzenelson, took part in the Third Zionist congress at Basle, and was subsequently elected to the Directorate of the Jewish Colonial Trust. A close friend of Dr. Theodor Herzl, he was invited to accompany him to Saint Petersburg in 1903. After signing the Vyborg Manifesto, he spent three months in prison and was forbidden to stand again for election.

Sources

1862 births
1925 deaths
People from Babruysk
People from Bobruysky Uyezd
Belarusian Jews
Russian Constitutional Democratic Party members
Members of the 1st State Duma of the Russian Empire
Jewish activists
Bankers from the Russian Empire
Zionists from the Russian Empire
Belarusian Zionists
Jewish Russian politicians
Humboldt University of Berlin alumni